Verges may refer to:

Places
 Verges, Catalonia, Spain
 Verges, Jura, France

People
 Vergès, French surname
 Bruno Verges (born 1975), rugby league player
 Dominica Verges (1918–2002), Cuban singer
 Marta Rovira i Vergés (born 1977), Spanish lawyer and politician
 Martí Vergés (born 1934), Spanish footballer
 Olimpio Otero Vergés (1845–1911), Puerto Rican merchant, attorney, composer
 Rosa Vergés (born 1955), Spanish film director who won a 1991 Goya Award
 Troy Verges, American songwriter
 Verges, a character in William Shakespeare's play Much Ado About Nothing
 , editor and publisher of Josep Pla

See also 
 Verge (disambiguation)
 Vargas (disambiguation)